Kevin van Kippersluis (born 30 June 1993) is a Dutch professional footballer who plays as a winger or attacking midfielder for Tweede Divisie club Quick Boys. Besides the Netherlands, he has played in Indonesia, Spain, and Sweden.

References

External links
 
 

1993 births
Living people
Sportspeople from Hilversum
Dutch footballers
Association football midfielders
Eerste Divisie players
Tweede Divisie players
AFC Ajax players
FC Utrecht players
Excelsior Rotterdam players
FC Volendam players
SC Cambuur players
Go Ahead Eagles players
Quick Boys players
Liga 1 (Indonesia) players
Persib Bandung players
Segunda División B players
CD Badajoz players
Superettan players
AFC Eskilstuna players
Dutch expatriate footballers
Expatriate footballers in Indonesia
Expatriate footballers in Spain
Expatriate footballers in Sweden
Dutch expatriate sportspeople in Indonesia
Dutch expatriate sportspeople in Spain
Dutch expatriate sportspeople in Sweden
Footballers from North Holland